Mas Elysa Yasmin Zulkifli (born 19 May 2001) is a Malaysian cricketer. She made her Women's Twenty20 International (WT20I) debut for Malaysia on 3 June 2018, in the 2018 Women's Twenty20 Asia Cup.

She once held the record for the best bowling figures in a Twenty20 International, by taking 6/3 from 4.0 overs against China at the Thailand Women's T20 Smash on 16 January 2019 at Asian Institute of Technology Ground in Bangkok. Her feat was reported in Malaysia newspapers, unusually for women's cricket in the country. In April 2021, she was one of 15 players to be awarded a contract by the Malaysian Cricket Association, the first time female cricketers for the Malaysian team had been granted contracts.

In November 2021, she was named in Malaysia's side for the 2021 ICC Women's T20 World Cup Asia Qualifier tournament in the United Arab Emirates.
In October 2022, she played for Malaysia in Women's Twenty20 Asia Cup.

References

External links
 

2001 births
Living people
Malaysian women cricketers
Malaysia women Twenty20 International cricketers
Southeast Asian Games medalists in cricket
Southeast Asian Games bronze medalists for Malaysia
Competitors at the 2017 Southeast Asian Games